Jennifer Government is a 2003 dystopian novel by Max Barry, set in an alternate reality where most nations in the Americas and Oceania are dominated by powerful corporations and corporate coalitions, and where government power is extremely limited. It was a finalist for a Campbell Award in its year of eligibility, but did not win, and was included in The New York Times annual list of notable books. The novel was retitled from Jennifer Government to Logoland in its German and Italian editions. In its Brazilian edition it was retitled to EU S/A, an abbreviation of Estados Unidos Sociedade Anônima''', which roughly translates to United States, Inc.To help promote the novel, Barry created a browser game titled Jennifer Government: NationStates (later shortened to NationStates). In the game, players make choices which are inspired by the novel and which affect the economy, society, and culture of their countries. NationStates launched alongside the book and remains active as of December 2022.

Setting
In the alternate present the novel portrays, the United States has taken over all of North and South America (except for Cuba) and dominates South Africa, the United Kingdom, Ireland, Iceland, India, Japan, various Pacific island countries, the Philippines, South Korea, Taiwan, Thailand, Myanmar, Indonesia, and (most recently) Australia and New Zealand. Russia is said to be affiliated with the US but not fully absorbed, and whether or not Russia actually belongs to the United States is not explained. With so much land in a single market, international trade has become unnecessary, and thus the United States cuts itself off from countries that it has not yet taken over. The official language of all United States holdings is now "American", formerly known as American English. British English and its associated accents no longer exist.

The United States adopts "capitalizm", a form of minarchy that abolishes taxation and privatizes government. This makes the government unable to write new laws or even to hold elections. The President of the United States still retains command of the armed forces, but the office is effectively ceremonial. The Judiciary only handles cases that violate the "new constitution".  As a result, the government is a night-watchman state, its main activity preventing foreign aggression and enforcing constitutional laws. Crimes can also be solved, but the government's budget only covers investigations if the victim or the victim's family pays for it.

People take the names of the corporations that employ them as their surnames, and persons with two jobs hyphenate their name, e.g. "Julia Nike-McDonald's". Employees of the government, including the novel's title character, take the surname Government. Schools are sponsored and controlled by corporations, such as McDonald's and Mattel. Children who attend school are given the corporate sponsor's name as a surname, parenthesised with their parents' surnames, e.g. "Kate Mattel (Government)". Though little is revealed about the curriculum, it is implied that many of the lessons are corporate propaganda.

Two formerly-non-corporate organisations have also attained considerable power: the Police and the NRA. The Police are a combination of law enforcement and mercenary agencies, only becoming involved in disputes when contracted by interested parties. The NRA has become a complete mercenary-for-hire organisation, able to deploy a fully-equipped military force.

Most corporations belong to one of two massive coalitions (in the guise of "customer loyalty programs"), US Alliance and Team Advantage, which fiercely compete with each other. US Alliance members include Nike, IBM, Pepsi, McDonald's, and the NRA. Team Advantage members include the Police, ExxonMobil, Burger King, and Apple.

Other notable aspects of United States society include pre-payment before emergency services can be dispatched, the abolition of welfare, the complete deregulation of weapons, legalised drugs sold in supermarkets, and privately owned roads with toll charges.

Plot
John Nike, Vice President of Guerrilla Marketing, contracts Hack Nike, a clumsy and naïve low-level-employee, to execute an ambitious and unethical secret marketing scheme. John plans to increase interest in the upcoming Nike Mercury shoes by having Hack kill people who try to buy them, intending to make the shoes appear so desirable that customers are killing each other to acquire them. Hack signs the contract without reading it. When he finds out that it requires him to commit murder, he subcontracts the scheme to the Police, now a mercenary organisation, in an attempt to keep his job (which requires fulfilling the contract) without having to take responsibility for murder.

After several children are murdered at various Nike stores on opening day, Jennifer Government takes it upon herself to track down the perpetrators, even if she cannot get the funding for her investigation. One of the murdered children bought the shoes with money given to her by Buy Mitsui, a French stockbroker flush with money after recent professional success. Feeling personally responsible for the girl's death, Buy joins forces with Jennifer.

At the same time, Violet (Hack's girlfriend) creates a dangerous computer virus, intending to sell it to the highest bidder. She succeeds in selling it to ExxonMobil. Her handlers take her all over the world to exploit the virus's power, but never pay her for it. Angered, Violet turns to John Nike, who promises to help her revenge herself on ExxonMobil. In exchange, John demands that Violet kidnap Kate, Jennifer Government's daughter, intending to use her as leverage to deter Jennifer's investigation.

Hack Nike is fired and founds an anti-corporate activist group in order to take revenge on John Nike. Hack and Jennifer Government succeed in rescuing Kate and arresting John.

Film adaptation
Barry optioned film rights for Jennifer Government to Section 8, a production company owned by Steven Soderbergh and George Clooney early in the book's life. In 2005, Louis Mellis and Dave Scinto, writers of Sexy Beast'', were chosen by Soderbergh and Clooney to write the screenplay. However, with the closure of Section 8 in 2006, the film rights returned to Barry.

References

External links

Max Barry's Jennifer Government page
Jennifer Government: NationStates website

2003 Australian novels
2003 science fiction novels
Doubleday (publisher) books
Dystopian novels
Fictional civil servants
Novels about consumerism
Novels by Max Barry
Australian satirical novels